Andrejs Kiriļins (born 3 November 1995) is a Latvian footballer who plays for Palanga.

Club career

FC ViOn Zlaté Moravce
Kiriļins made his professional Fortuna Liga debut for ViOn Zlaté Moravce on 4 April 2015 against Ružomberok.

FK Palanga
After a short spell at Spartaks Jūrmala, Kiriļins became a member of Lithuanian Palanga in the summer 2019. First match for new club played on 3 August 2019, in match of the 18 round against Riteriai, which was lost by result 0:1.

Later career
At the end of January 2020, Kiriļins moved to German club SV 90 Altengottern. He only played one official game for the club, before the COVID-19 pandemic erupted. In October 2020, he then returned to Latvia where he signed with FK Dinamo Rīga in the Latvian First League.

References

External links
 FC ViOn profile
 Eurofotbal profile
 
 Futbalnet profile

1995 births
Living people
Latvian footballers
Latvia youth international footballers
Latvia under-21 international footballers
Latvian expatriate footballers
Association football midfielders
FK Liepājas Metalurgs players
FK Jelgava players
FC ViOn Zlaté Moravce players
FK Spartaks Jūrmala players
FK Palanga players
Slovak Super Liga players
Latvian Higher League players
A Lyga players
Latvian expatriate sportspeople in Slovakia
Expatriate footballers in Slovakia
Latvian expatriate sportspeople in Lithuania
Expatriate footballers in Lithuania
Latvian expatriate sportspeople in Germany
Expatriate footballers in Germany
Place of birth missing (living people)